Friedrich von Arenstorff (1626 – 1689) was a German born  officer in Swedish and Danish military service.

Military career
Arenstorff was born at Rosenow in Mecklenburg. In 1645 he began his military career in the Swedish Army in Poland and took part in the battle of Copenhagen in 1660. After the death of King Charles X Gustav of Sweden in 1660,  the Swedish government sought to get rid of the army's foreign officers. In 1661 he entered service with the Danish military. In 1672 he became an assessor in the Royal Danish Military Academy.
In 1676 he started to command the Royal Danish Army  at the Battle of Lund  after injury to his brother Carl von Arenstorff  (1625–1676) and the  escape of King Christian V of Denmark.

He wounded during the Battle of Landskrona in 1677.
In 1678 he commanded the Danish army in Scania. It is thought that his decision to lay waste the countryside and various country houses where Swedish troops were stationed created a lot of hostility among the local population.He disobeyed the order to save the trapped Danish army at Kristianstad and because of that he was sentenced to death with loss of title, land and property. But later he was reprieved by the King. In 1686, he was made commanding general in Schleswig-Holstein.
In 1689, he died and was buried in Udbyneder Church in  Randers.

References

Arenstorff, Friedrich von
Arenstorff, Friedrich von
Arenstorff, Friedrich von
Arenstorff
Arenstorff
16th-century Swedish military personnel